The Canton of Sancerre is a canton situated in the Cher département and is in the Centre-Val de Loire region of France.

Geography 
An area of farming and winegrowing in the valley of the river Loire, in the northeastern part of the arrondissement of Bourges centred on the town of Sancerre. The altitude varies from 139m at Bannay to 392m at Sens-Beaujeu, with an average altitude of 219m.

Composition 
At the French canton reorganisation which came into effect in March 2015, the canton was expanded from 18 to 36 communes:
 
Assigny
Bannay
Barlieu
Belleville-sur-Loire
Boulleret
Bué
Concressault
Couargues
Crézancy-en-Sancerre
Dampierre-en-Crot
Feux
Gardefort
Jalognes
Jars
Léré
Menetou-Râtel
Ménétréol-sous-Sancerre
Le Noyer
Saint-Bouize
Sainte-Gemme-en-Sancerrois
Saint-Satur
Sancerre
Santranges
Savigny-en-Sancerre
Sens-Beaujeu
Subligny
Sury-en-Vaux
Sury-ès-Bois
Sury-près-Léré
Thauvenay
Thou
Vailly-sur-Sauldre
Veaugues
Verdigny
Villegenon
Vinon

Population

See also 
 Arrondissements of the Cher department
 Cantons of the Cher department
 Communes of the Cher department

References

Sancerre